KWSS may refer to:

KWSS-LP, a low-power radio station (93.9 FM) licensed to Scottsdale, Arizona, United States
KFAT (defunct), a defunct radio station (94.5 FM) later known as KWSS